The Das Almas River, or Jequié River is a river in the state of Bahia, Brazil.  It empties into the Atlantic Ocean.

The Wenceslau Guimarães Ecological Station was created in 1997 to protect the headwaters of the Das Almas River.

See also
List of rivers of Amazonas (Brazilian state)

References

Rivers of Bahia